was a town located in Shimomashiki District, Kumamoto Prefecture, Japan.

On November 1, 2004, Tomochi, along with the town of Chūō (also inShimomashiki District), was merged to create the town of Misato and no longer exists as an independent municipality.

External links
 Official website of Misato 

Dissolved municipalities of Kumamoto Prefecture